This is a list of geographical features in the state of Thuringia, Germany.

Mountains 

 Harz
 Rhön
 Thuringian Forest

Rivers 
 Gera (through Arnstadt and Erfurt)
 Ilm (through Ilmenau and Weimar)
 Leine (through Leinefelde-Worbis and Heiligenstadt)
 Pleiße (through Altenburg)
 Saale (through Saalfeld, Rudolstadt and Jena) 
 Sprotte (through Schmölln) 
 Unstrut (through Mühlhausen, Bad Langensalza and Sömmerda)
 White Elster (through Greiz and Gera)
 Werra (through Hildburghausen, Meiningen and Bad Salzungen)
 Wipper (through Sondershausen)

Miscellaneous 

 Eichsfeld
 Hainich National Park

Cities and towns 

see List of towns in Thuringia

 
Thuringia-related lists
Thuringia